Robin Jones may refer to:

Robin Jones (basketball) (1954–2018), American basketball player
Robin Jones (musician) (born 1973), Scottish drummer
Robin Jones (cricketer) (born 1973), English cricketer
Robin Jones (figure skater) (1943–1986), British figure skater

See also
Robin Jones Gunn, American Christian novelist
Robin Griffith-Jones (born 1956), English Anglican priest
Robin Lloyd-Jones (born 1934), author
Robin Wright-Jones (born 1950), American politician